This is a list of lighthouses in Chile from Huasco to San Antonio.

Huasco

Coquimbo

Bahía de Quintero

Bahía Concón

Bahía de Valparaíso

San Antonio

See also
List of fjords, channels, sounds and straits of Chile
List of islands of Chile

References
  List of Lights, Radio Aids and Fog Signals: The West Coast of North and South America... National Geospatial-Intelligence Agency. 2013. pp. 20–60.

NGA1155.8-NGA1312
NGA1155.8-NGA1312
Lighthouses NGA1155.8-NGA1312